Essex is an unincorporated community and census-designated place in Baltimore County, Maryland, United States. Essex has a long history dating back to 1909. The population was 39,262 at the 2010 census and is growing in population each year. The town hosts beaches, parks, wetlands, a courthouse, and a museum which was once a school, courthouse, jail, and firehouse. The town has a strip of shops known as the business district on Eastern boulevard starting from Virginia avenue to Marlyn avenue. The business district originally started from Mace avenue to Marlyn Avenue. Its largest shopping center, Middlesex, was built in 1955 which once had a department store Montgomery Ward and food fair as the anchors of the shopping center.

History

Essex is located on a peninsula bodied by the middle river to the east and the back river to the west. Essex was originally ten blocks, running from Mace Avenue to Marlyn Avenue. It began in 1909 by the Taylor Land Company for the residents in Baltimore who wanted a place outside the city limits to perhaps grow a garden or to pursue some other rural activity. Land was cheap, and sales were enhanced by a promotional pamphlet.

Henry Guttenberger built the first general store in Essex in 1910 on the corner of Eastern Boulevard and Mace Avenue. Between 1911 and 1912, the Taylor Land Company donated the lots for Essex Methodist and St. John's Lutheran churches. They also donated the land where the volunteer fire department built their station. The permanent fire station opened in 1921.

With the ever-growing population came the need to build schools. The elementary school opened in 1925 with 400 students. Essex Community College, now CCBC-Essex, was founded in 1957. Classes were first held at Kenwood High School, with fifty part-time and nine full-time students. In 1961, the college moved to Dorsey Avenue, and in 1968 moved to its present location, in Rossville. This site was owned by the Mace family, and the family burial plot is maintained and protected by the college.

A fire in August 1957 destroyed an entire block of businesses on Eastern Boulevard, and the towns business district never fully recovered from that catastrophe. The ten-alarm blaze caused a half million dollars in damages, and, in the time it took to repair the buildings, new shopping centers were built, changing the buying habits of consumers.

The Glenn L. Martin Company was the single biggest reason for the rapid growth of the area. Employment at the company peaked at more than 53,000 workers during World War II. In the years following, industry in the area dwindled, and much of the original Glenn L. Martin facility became the property of the State, including Martin State Airport. The remaining aerospace business followed a progression of corporate mergers and today is owned and operated by Lockheed Martin.

Another important company was Eastern Rolling Mill, which opened in 1919. The plant, at the head of the Back River, produced carbon sheet steel. In 1944, Eastern merged with Industrial Stainless Steel, Inc. to form Easco. The plant then merged with the British company Avesta-Sheffield in the early 1990s, finally shutting down operations in the late 1990s.

Today, there is interest in revitalizing Essex by including it in government-sponsored empowerment zones. Many neighborhoods have begun a "clean-up" of their areas, hoping to transform Essex into a place that will be ready to move into the twenty-first century.  Improvements include removal of run-down, low-income housing, including the Tall Trees Community, Edgewater apartments, and the Riverdale Community; new medians and pavement on Eastern boulevard; a new Essex monolith replaced the old Essex cube, and new developments being built around the town.

Ballestone Mansion built in 1800 was listed on the National Register of Historic Places in 1975. 

On August 2, 2009, the community of Essex celebrated its 100th birthday with a party at Cox's Point Park on Riverside Drive. It featured live music by Joey McCann, Mickey Light, Maria Rose, Don "Big Daddy Country" Cox, and others.

Sources: Baltimore County Public Library

Geography
Essex is located at  (39.307737, −76.451710).

The town is on mostly flat to gently rolling terrain, transitioning to marshland at the tip of the peninsula close to the Chesapeake Bay. Essex has a small island on the Chesapeake Bay named Hart Miller Island. The island is only accessible by boat, and the closest boat launch is located in Rocky Point. The island boasts an observation tower, beaches, and hiking trails. A made made landfill linking two Chesapeake islands consisting of Hart and Miller island.

Demographics

As of the census of 2000, there were 39,078 people, 15,952 households, and 10,336 families residing in the CDP. The racial makeup of the CDP was 74.56% White, 20.98% African American, 0.55% Native American, 1.17% Asian, 0.05% Pacific Islander, 0.82% from other races, and 1.87% from two or more races. Hispanic or Latino of any race were 2.26% of the population.

There were 15,952 households, out of which 31.8% had children under the age of 18 living with them, 40.8% were married couples living together, 18.2% had a female householder with no husband present, and 35.2% were non-families. 29.3% of all households were made up of individuals, and 10.4% had someone living alone who was 65 years of age or older. The average household size was 2.45 and the average family size was 3.00.

In the CDP, the population was spread out, with 26.1% under the age of 18, 8.9% from 18 to 24, 30.5% from 25 to 44, 21.7% from 45 to 64, and 12.8% who were 65 years of age or older. The median age was 36 years. For every 100 females, there were 93.1 males. For every 100 females age 18 and over, there were 88.3 males.

The median income for a household in the CDP was $34,978, and the median income for a family was $42,177. Males had a median income of $34,105 versus $26,215 for females. The per capita income for the CDP was $17,550. About 10.0% of families and 12.2% of the population were below the poverty line, including 16.2% of those under age 18 and 11.0% of those age 65 or over.

Schools in Essex, Maryland
Mars Estates Elementary School
Essex Elementary School
Sandalwood Elementary School
Middleborough Elementary School 
Middlesex Elementary School
Sussex Elementary School 
Stemmers Run Middle School
Deep Creek Middle School
Kenwood High School
Chesapeake High School 
Eastern Technical High School
Our Lady of Mount Carmel School
St. Stephens Academy

Notable person
 Lamar King, former NFL defensive end
 Ego Nwodim, current Saturday Night Live performer

References

External links

 Essex-Middle River-White Marsh Chamber of Commerce

 
Census-designated places in Maryland
Census-designated places in Baltimore County, Maryland
Maryland populated places on the Chesapeake Bay